The Missouri State Lady Bears basketball team represents Missouri State University in NCAA Division I women's basketball. The team has a storied history making 2 NCAA Final Fours, reaching 17 NCAA Tournaments, and claiming 13 conference regular season titles. The Lady Bears compete in the Missouri Valley Conference.

History
Missouri State, known as Southwest Missouri State (SMSU) until 2005, began play in women's basketball in 1969. The Lady Bears played in the Missouri AIAW state tournaments from 1970–1982, post-season AIAW regional tournaments in 1974, 1975 and 1981, and the AIAW Division II national tourney in 1981. In 1982, the Lady Bears joined the ranks of Division I programs in the NCAA. From 1982 to 1992, the Lady Bears played in the Gateway Collegiate Athletic Conference before that conference was absorbed by the Missouri Valley Conference in 1992.

Missouri State has made 17 appearances in the NCAA Tournament including six straight appearances from 1991–1996, four straight appearances from 1998–2001, as well as appearances in 2003, 2004, 2006, 2016, 2019, 2021, and 2022. The Lady Bears' tournament success is highlighted by two trips to the Final Four (1992, 2001), two Elite Eight appearances (1992, 2001) and five trips to the Sweet Sixteen (1992, 1993, 2001, 2019, 2021). 

The Lady Bears have made 8 appearances in the WNIT (2002, 2005, 2010, 2011, 2012, 2015, 2017, 2018). They won the 2005 WNIT, 78–70, over West Virginia. 

As of the end of the 2019–2020 season, they have an all-time record of 902–606 (.598).

1992 Final Four 
In 1992, Missouri State as an 8-seed became the lowest women's seed at the time to make the Final Four. The Lady Bears beat Kansas 75–59, Iowa 61–60 in overtime, UCLA 83–57 and Ole Miss 94–71. They were defeated 84–72 by Western Kentucky in the National Semifinals.

2001 Final Four 
In 2001 Missouri State earned a 5-seed in the West Region. The Lady Bears went to the Final Four in St. Louis after winning the West Region Missouri State defeated Toledo 89–71, Rutgers 60–53, Duke 81–71, and Washington 104–87. They were beaten in the National Semifinals by Purdue 81–64.

NCAA Tournament appearances

AIAW Division II tournament results
The Bears made one appearance in the AIAW National Division II basketball tournament, with a combined record of 0–1.

Retired Numbers
Missouri State has retired 3 numbers, which now hang in the rafters of the Lady Bear's home, JQH Arena. Additionally, former head coach, Cheryl Burnett was honored with a retired jersey in recognition of her leadership of the Lady Bear's program.

(#10) Jackie Stiles 

 AP Player of the Year (2001)
 3x- All American
 Wade Trophy Winner (2001)
 Women's Basketball Hall of Fame (2016)
 Missouri Valley Conference Hall of Fame
 Missouri Sports Hall of Fame
 WNBA Rookie of the Year (2001)
 3x- Missouri Valley Conference Player of the Year

 Player of the Year Award in MVC now bears her name

(#35) Melody Howard 

 2x- All-American
 3x- All Conference
 MVC Player of the Year (1994)
 Missouri Valley Conference Hall of Fame
 Missouri Sports Hall of Fame

(#42) Jeanette Tendai 

 2x- All American
 3x- All Conference Pick 
 MSU Hall of Fame
 Springfield Area Sport Hall of Fame
 MVC All-Centennial Team

(HC) Cheryl Burnett 

 Missouri State's winningest women's basketball coach
 319–136 (.711) in 15 season
 10 NCAA Tournaments
 2 Final Fours
 15 Conference Titles
 Led NCAA in attendance in 1992–1993
 Mentored 8 All-Americans, 6 Academic All-Americans, 5 League MVPs and 26 first-team all MVC selections

Year by year results

References

External links